The blacksail snake mackerel (Thyrsitoides marleyi), known also as the black snoek, is a species of snake mackerel found in the Indo-Pacific from shallow water to a depth of at least  where they appear to prefer slopes on seamounts and ridges. They are known for making diel vertical migrations to near-surface waters at night, feeding on fish, squid and crustaceans. This species is of minor importance to local commercial fisheries. It is at the only member of the genus Thyrsitoides, making the genus monotypic.

References

Further reading

External links
 Photograph

Gempylidae
Fish described in 1929